Arben Arbëri (born 6 January 1964) is an Albanian retired football player who is known for winning the Albanian Golden Boot for being the top goalscorer of the 1986-87 Albanian Superliga with 14 goals.

Club career
Arbëri played primarily as a striker for Tomori Berat in Albania and PAS Giannina in Greece.

International career
He made his debut for Albania in an October 1989 FIFA World Cup qualification match away at Sweden and earned a total of 3 caps, scoring no goals. His final international was a May 1990 European Championship qualification match against Iceland.

Personal life
His older brother Theodhor Arbëri was also a footballer who played for Tomori Berat during the 1980s and his younger brother Klodian have also played for Tomori Berat amongst other teams in Albania, while he also briefly played in Slovenia with NK Maribor. His nephews Gersi and Polizoi are also footballers who currently play for Tomori Berat and Flamurtari Vlorë respectively.

Honours

Personal
Albanian Superliga top scorer (1): 1986-87
Albanian First Division top scorer (1): 1987-88

References

External links

1964 births
Living people
Sportspeople from Berat
Association football forwards
Albanian footballers
Albania international footballers
FK Tomori Berat players
PAS Giannina F.C. players
Kategoria Superiore players
Albanian expatriate footballers
Expatriate footballers in Greece
Albanian expatriate sportspeople in Greece